911 Fire Rescue is a 2001 video game from WizardWorks. The player takes on the role of a fire-fighter and has to save victims and extinguish several different types of fires in 17 levels. The player must manage their character's health, oxygen and heat levels to avoid dying.

Reception

IGN gave the game a score of 5.5 out of 10 stating "For what it is, 911 Fire Rescue is a nice little diversion from more complex games that require memorizing 27 keyboard commands. There's really not much more to do here than move around using your Quake controls, while spaying fires with water and rescuing unconscious victims".

GameSpot gave the game a score of 5.8 out of 10 stating "The bargain-basement price and relatively original subject matter are definite selling points, but don't expect 911 Fire Rescue to burn brightly for more than a few hours or days"
"

References

2001 video games
First-person shooters
Single-player video games
Windows games
Video games about firefighting
WizardWorks games